Frederick John Starkey (20 February 1911 –  27 January 2001) was a British amateur athlete who in 1947 represented England at basketball and gymnastics. At the age of 28 he was the model for a sculpture of the Greek god Apollo by William Bloye, which stands in Coronation Gardens, Ednam Road, Dudley.

Starkey was born in George Avenue, Hay Mills, Birmingham. In later life he worked as a probation officer in Birmingham. He died in Sherborne, Dorset, aged 89.

References 

Probation and parole officers
People from Birmingham, West Midlands
2001 deaths
1911 births
British male artistic gymnasts
English men's basketball players
English artists' models